Uliyampalayam is a neighborhood in Coimbatore in the Indian state of Tamil Nadu. It is located near Thondamuthur.

References

Cities and towns in Coimbatore district